Gerry P. Richard (born February 26, 1956) is a Canadian curler and curling coach from Kelowna, British Columbia.

Awards
British Columbia Sports Hall of Fame: inducted in 1995 with all of 1994 Rick Folk team, Canadian and World champions

Teams

Record as a coach of national teams

Personal life
Richard's children are known curlers as well. His daughter Jeanna Schraeder played third on the World and Canadian champion Kelly Scott rink. His son Jeff played in two Briers. He is formerly married to Kerrylyn Richard, and is currently married to Martina.

References

External links

Gerry Richard – Curling Canada Stats Archive

Living people
1956 births
Sportspeople from Kelowna
Canadian male curlers
Curlers from British Columbia
World curling champions
Brier champions
Canadian curling coaches